Pádraig Brehony (born 28 January 1993) is an Irish hurler who plays as a forward for the Galway senior team. At club level he plays with Tynagh-Abbey/Duniry.

Brehony was part of the Galway minor team that won the All-Ireland title in 2011 where he scored 0-4 in the final against Dublin.

References

1993 births
Living people
Galway inter-county hurlers
Tynagh-Abbey/Duniry hurlers